Cnodalia is a genus of Asian orb-weaver spiders first described by Tamerlan Thorell in 1890.

Species
 it contains four species:
Cnodalia ampliabdominis (Song, Zhang & Zhu, 2006) – China
Cnodalia flavescens Mi, Peng & Yin, 2010 – China
Cnodalia harpax Thorell, 1890 – Indonesia (Sumatra), Japan
Cnodalia quadrituberculata Mi, Peng & Yin, 2010 – China

References

Araneidae
Araneomorphae genera
Spiders of Asia
Taxa named by Tamerlan Thorell